This article lists the episodes and short summaries of the 23rd to 45th and 51st episodes of the  anime series, known in the English dub as the third season of Ranma ½ or "Hard Battle".

Rumiko Takahashi's manga series Ranma ½ was adapted into two anime series: Ranma ½ which ran on Fuji TV for 18 episodes and Ranma ½ Nettōhen which ran for 143. The first TV series was canceled due to low ratings in September 1989, but was then brought back in December as the much more popular and much longer-running Ranma ½ Nettōhen.

Viz Media licensed both anime for English dubs and labeled them as one. They released them in North America in seven DVD collections they call "seasons". Nettōhen episodes 23 to 45 and 51 are season 2, which was given the title "Hard Battle". Episode 51 was inserted as episode 63 in this season, while 46 to 50 are in season 4.



Episode list

References
 Ranma ½ Perfect Edition Anime Episode Summaries

1990 Japanese television seasons
Season 3